David Tipton may refer to:
David Tipton (defensive tackle) (born 1953), defensive tackle for the New England Patriots of the National Football League
Dave Tipton (born 1949), defensive end for several NFL teams from 1971 to 1976